Phalaenopsis marriottiana is a species of orchid native to Southeast China and Myanmar. The specific epithet marriottiana honours William Henry Smith-Marriott (1835-1924), who had a considerable orchid collection at Down House, Blandford, Dorsetshire in England.

Description
These small, cool-growing epiphytes have fleshy, distichously arranged leaves. Flowering occurs in Winter and Spring from axillary racemes, which bear 2-6 fragrant flowers.

Ecology
This species is found on limestone cliffs in deciduous, montane forests and foothills at elevations around 1300 meters above sea level.

Taxonomy

Taxonomic history
This species was assigned to several different genera throughout its taxonomic history and was formerly believed to be a variant of Phalaenopsis hygrochila. It was later proven by genetic evidence, that the variations parishii and marriottiana of the former broadly defined Phalaenopsis hygrochila (syn. Hygrochilus parishii) are two separate species.

Differentiation from Phalaenopsis hygrochila
The petals and sepals of Phalaenopsis marriottiana are brownish to purple and lack darker spotting. The flowers may also be pink with yellow sepals and a purple-red, flabellate labellum, which was characteristic for Phalaenopsis pingxiangensis, which was reduced to synonymy with Phalaenopsis marriottiana due to genetic evidence. On the other hand Phalaenopsis hygrochila has yellow sepals and petals, which are heavily spotted with deep red-brown.

Phylogeny
This species is the sister species of the remainder of Phalaenopsis subgen. Hygrochilus, as can be seen in the following cladogram:

Conservation
International trade is regulated through the CITES appendix II regulations of international trade.

References

marriottiana
Orchids of Myanmar
Orchids of China
Epiphytic orchids